Struers  is a Danish engineering company, providing equipment for metallography preparation and inspection. Holger F. Struer a Danish chemist founded Struers in 1875 in Copenhagen. Struers introduced Micropol, a new process for electrolytic polishing.[1]

Struers provide cutting, mounting, grinding, polishing, micro evaluation, hardness testing equipment  and consumables for the analysis of metal samples. Government departments, universities, NASA and International Metallographic Society use Struers equipment in analysis metal or material samples.

Today, Struers is a global organization with offices in 24 countries and a presence in more than 60 countries, specializing in equipment, consumables, and application expertise for the preparation (mounting, grinding and polishing, hardness testing) and analysis of material samples .

Struers is owned by Roper, a US-based diversified technology company with annual revenues of $5.4 billion.

References 

Danish companies established in 1875